Psilorhynchus olliei is a freshwater ray-finned fish, from Kyari Chaung, Ayeyarwaddy drainage in Myanmar.

The fish is named in honor of friend and colleague Oliver (Ollie) Crimmen (b. 1954), the fish curator at the  Natural History Museum in London, for his help and company during a number of recent field trips to Myanmar.

References

olliei
Fish of Asia
Fish of Myanmar
Taxa named by Kevin W. Conway
Taxa named by Ralf Britz
Fish described in 2015